Nightmare Hour  is a 1999 children's horror collection by R. L. Stine. It is composed of 10 different short stories, ranging from "Pumpkinhead" to "The Ghostly Stare", and was a New York Times bestseller from the year 1999 to 2000.

All but "Make Me a Witch" were made into episodes of R. L. Stine's The Haunting Hour TV series. However, "Make Me a Witch" is similar to the "Intruders" episode.

Stories
 Pumpkinhead
 Alien Candy
 The Most Evil Sorcerer
 Nightmare Inn
 I'm Not Martin
 The Black Mask
 Afraid of Clowns
 The Dead Body
 Make Me A Witch
 The Ghostly Stare

Reception
Nightmare Hour was on the New York Times bestseller list from 1999 to 2000 and was awarded the Disney Adventures Kids' Choice Award for Best Horror/Mystery Book.

Sofrina Hinton from Kidsreads said "with its lavish illustrations and clever, direct storytelling and themes that speak to every one of us, NIGHTMARE HOUR is a worthy read for horror fans of any age". Maria Dolan from Amazon commented that "these are tales you'll be too scared to put down". Molly S. Kinney from the Library Journal stated "it's guaranteed to produce goosebumps".

References

External links

1999 short story collections
Children's short story collections
Horror short story collections
Young adult short story collections
Works by R. L. Stine
HarperCollins books
American short story collections
1999 children's books